USS Enright (DE-216/APD-66) was a  in service with the United States Navy from 1943 to 1946. In 1967, she was transferred to Ecuador where she served until she was scrapped in 1989.

History

United States Navy (1943–1967)
Enright was named in honor of Ensign Robert Paul Francis Enright (1916–1942), who was killed in action while serving aboard the destroyer  during the Battle of Midway on 6 June 1942.  The ship was launched on 29 May 1943 by Philadelphia Navy Yard; sponsored by Mrs. Katherine L. Enright, mother of Ensign Enright; and commissioned on 21 September 1943.

Enright made two voyages from east coast ports to escort convoys to NS Argentia, Newfoundland, between 15 November and 9 December 1943, then took up demanding duty escorting convoys across the North Atlantic.  During the next year, she made six voyages to British ports, guarding the passage of men and supplies destined for the vast operations on the European continent, and one voyage to Oran.

On 16 April 1944, while westward bound, Enright was struck by a merchantman ship approaching the convoy.  A 65-foot hole was torn in her port quarter, forward living spaces were flooded, and she took on a 9° list.  The high quality of her crew was shown both in damage control work and the seamanship which brought her safely back to New York, where she was repaired in a month.

She was reclassified APD-66 on 21 January 1945. Converted to a Charles Lawrence-class high speed transport at Boston Navy Yard early in 1945, Enright sailed from Norfolk, Virginia on 7 April for Pacific duty.  She trained at Pearl Harbor for two weeks, then escorted a convoy to Eniwetok and Ulithi, continuing until she arrived off Okinawa on 11 June 1945.  Aside from a two-week absence in July to escort a convoy from Leyte Island in the Philippines to Okinawa, Enright served in the anti-submarine screen around Okinawa until 24 July.  For the next month, she carried mail among southern Philippines, and to Brunei Bay, Borneo.

Enright cleared Leyte Gulf on 21 August 1945, to escort a supply convoy to a rendezvous off Tokyo Bay, then returned to Manila to begin a series of voyages escorting transports and carrying troops herself to the occupation of Japan and China.  On 2 December 1945, she sailed from Manila for Norfolk, arriving 11 January 1946.

She was decommissioned and placed in reserve at Green Cove Springs, Florida, 21 June 1946.

Ecuadorian Navy (1967–1989)
Enright was transferred to Ecuador on 14 July 1967 and was renamed escort destroyer BAE 25 de Julio (E-12). The ship was renamed and reclassified as frigate BAE Morán Valverde (D-01) in 1975 and was purchased outright by Ecuador on 30 August 1978. She was stricken from the United States Naval Vessel Register on 31 March 1978. The ship was deleted in 1989.

Awards
Enright received one battle star for World War II service.

References

External links 

  USS Enright website
 

Buckley-class destroyer escorts
Ships built in Philadelphia
1943 ships
World War II frigates and destroyer escorts of the United States
Charles Lawrence-class high speed transports
World War II amphibious warfare vessels of the United States
Ships transferred from the United States Navy to the Ecuadorian Navy
Frigates of the Ecuadorian Navy